Locomotion No. 1 (originally named Active) is an early steam locomotive that was built in 1825 by the pioneering railway engineers George and Robert Stephenson at their manufacturing firm, Robert Stephenson and Company. It became the first steam locomotive to haul a passenger-carrying train on a public railway, the Stockton and Darlington Railway (S&DR).

Locomotion No. 1 was ordered by the Stockton and Darlington Railway Company in September 1824; its design benefitted from George Stephenson's experience building his series of Killingworth locomotives. It is believed that Locomotion No. 1 was the first locomotive to make use of coupling rods to link together its driving wheels, reducing the chance of the wheels slipping on the iron rails. However, the centre-flue boiler proved to be a weakness, providing for a poor heating surface compared to later multi-flue boilers.

In September 1825, Locomotion No. 1 hauled the first train on the Stockton and Darlington Railway, and became the first locomotive to run on a public railway. On 1 July 1828, it was heavily damaged when its boiler exploded at  station, resulting in the death of its driver, John Cree. It was rebuilt but, as a consequence of the rapid advances in locomotive design, Locomotion No. 1 became obsolete within a decade. It was used on the railway until 1850, after which it was converted into a stationary engine. In 1857, as a consequence of its historical importance, Locomotion No. 1 was preserved and put on display. Between 1892 and 1975, it was on static display at one of the platforms at Darlington Bank Top railway station, and was then on display at the Head of Steam museum based at Darlington North Road railway station between 1975 and 2021. It is presently at the Locomotion museum in Shildon. A working replica of Locomotion has also been built and following years of operation at Beamish Museum is now on display at the Head of Steam museum.

History

Origins
On 23 June 1823, the pioneering locomotive manufacturer Robert Stephenson and Company was established by the railway engineers George Stephenson and his son Robert Stephenson, and the businessmen Edward Pease and Thomas Richardson. In November of that year, only months after the company started operations, a key order was placed by the Stockton & Darlington Railway Company for four stationary engines.

On 16 September 1824, the S&DR ordered a pair of steam locomotives, at a price of £550 (about £ today) each. This order was historically important as the first of these locomotives, Active (later renamed Locomotion No. 1), was the first steam locomotive to haul a passenger train on a public railway.

Design

The design of Locomotion combined and built on the improvements that George Stephenson had incorporated in his Killingworth locomotives. The locomotive weighed 6.6 tonnes, with many elements, including the boiler, cylinders and wheels, composed of cast iron, although the frame was timber. There were four  diameter driving wheels.

Locomotion No. 1 used high-pressure (50 psi) steam generated in a centre-flue boiler and driving a pair of vertical cylinders,  in diameter, which were half embedded within the boiler. The boiler had a blastpipe in the chimney. The single flue boiler had a low heating surface-to-water ratio compared to later boiler designs. A pair of cross-heads above the cylinders transmitted the power through a pair of coupling rods, making use of a loose eccentric valve gear. Locomotion No. 1 is believed to have been the first locomotive to use coupling rods to connect its driving wheels together, an approach which considerably decreased the chance of slipping.

According to author H. C. Casserley, Locomotion No. 1 is most notable for being the first locomotive to haul a passenger train on a public railway than for the innovations in its design.

Operations
The completed Locomotion No.1 was transported by road from Newcastle to Darlington in September 1825. On 26 September, the day before the opening of the Stockton and Darlington Railway, the locomotive was taken on a trial run between Shildon and Darlington, with a number of the railway's directors aboard the railway's first passenger coach, known as ‘’Experiment’’. The driver, who had to perch on a small platform beside the boiler, was James Stephenson, the elder brother to George Stephenson; the fireman, William Gowling, stood on a footplate between the engine and the tender.

On 27 September 1825, Locomotion No.1 hauled the first train on the Stockton and Darlington Railway, driven by George Stephenson. The train consisted of Locomotion No.1, eleven wagons of coal, the carriage ‘’Experiment’’, and a further 20 wagons of passengers, guests, and workmen. Around 300 tickets had been sold but about twice as many people were believed to have been aboard.

Locomotion No. 1 continued to haul trains on the S&DR for three years. On 1 July 1828, the locomotive was heavily damaged when the boiler exploded while the train was stopped at  station, resulting in the death of the driver, John Cree, and the wounding of water pumper, Edward Turnbull. Cree had tied down the arm of a safety valve, which caused the boiler pressure to rise to the point of explosion.

Locomotion No. 1 was rebuilt and returned to service and ran until 1850. On 4 June 1846, it hauled the opening train on the Middlesbrough and Redcar Railway, a subsidiary of the S&DR.

Following its withdrawal, Locomotion was purchased by Joseph Pease and Partners, converted into a stationary pumping engine for use at their West Collieries in South Durham, where it was used until 1857.

Heraldry

Locomotion 1 is such an important part of Darlington's history that it is depicted on the town's coat of arms, and on the badges of its football and rugby clubs.

Preservation 
In 1856, Joseph Pease and his family spent £50 to restore the S&DR Company's Locomotion No. 1, saving it from the scrapyard when its working life had ended; it was one of the first locomotives to be restored for preservation.

Between 1857 and the 1880s, it was usually on the pedestal display at Alfred Kitching's workshop near the Hopetown Carriage Works. It was on exhibition in Philadelphia in 1876, Newcastle in 1881, Chicago in 1883, Liverpool in 1886, Newcastle in 1887, Paris in 1889, Edinburgh in 1890. Locomotion No.1 was steamed for the Stockton and Darlington Railway's Golden Jubilee in September 1875, as well as to participate in a procession of locomotives at the George Stephenson Centenary, in June 1881. Locomotion always returned to its static display in Darlington, the headquarters of the Stockton and Darlington Railway Company.

From 1892 to 1975, Locomotion was on static display along with Derwent, another early locomotive, on one of the platforms overlooking the S&DR line to Saltburn-by-the-Sea at Darlington's main station Bank Top.
During 1924, it was cosmetically restored.
During the Second World War, it was temporarily relocated (at Stanhope) due to the threat of bombing. In 1975 Darlington built its railway museum around Locomotion No. 1.

As ownership of the railways changed, the locomotive became a British Rail historic item, all of which were transferred as the National Collection in 1968 to the National Railway Museum (NRM), now part of the Science Museum Group (SMG). The locomotive, as its ownership changed, remained in Darlington from 1857, in later years on display at the Head of Steam museum in Darlington, in the same building as Darlington's North Road station. From 1975, it was formally on loan by the NRM to Head of Steam. The loan agreement expired in March 2021, after which the locomotive was moved to the NRM's outpost museum in Shildon, itself named Locomotion. Some in Darlington objected to the move, as the locomotive had resided in Darlington since preservation, and is depicted on the town's coat of arms and on the badges of its football and rugby clubs, and so it is claimed by some that the locomotive is only owned by the NRM due to an accident of history. An agreement was reached between Darlington Borough Council and the Science Museum Group which will see Locomotion return to Darlington for extended visits in the lead-up to the 200th anniversary of the Stockton and Darlington Railway in 2025.

As the original locomotive is too fragile to return to steam, a working replica was built in 1975, and was resident at Beamish Museum. After a period on display at the Locomotion museum, it moved to Head of Steam in April 2021, replacing the original. Originally only at Darlington on loan from Beamish, ownership of the replica was transferred to Darlington Borough Council, which will see the replica returned to service in time for the S&D's 200th anniversary.

See also 
 Locomotive No. 1, the first locomotive in New South Wales
 Tom Thumb, the first American steam locomotive
 Stockton Flyer, a sculpture inspired by Locomotion No. 1

References

External links 

 Darlington Railway Centre and Museum
 Photograph of Locomotion at the Darlington Railway Museum
 Postcard of Locomotion at the Darlington Bank Top station in 1959
 http://www.spartacus-educational.com/RAlocomotion.htm
 Photo (1975) of locomotive Locomotion No.1 on display at Darlington main station

Locomotives of the Stockton and Darlington Railway
0-4-0 locomotives
English inventions
Individual locomotives of Great Britain
Preserved steam locomotives of Great Britain
Early steam locomotives
Railway accidents in 1828
Railway accidents and incidents in County Durham
Tourist attractions in County Durham
George Stephenson
Railway boiler explosions